Nathaniel Oladejo Ogundipe is an Anglican bishop in Nigeria:  he is the current Bishop of Ifo.

Notes

Living people
Anglican bishops of Ifo
21st-century Anglican bishops in Nigeria
Year of birth missing (living people)